Fp2 may refer to:
Cyclopentadienyliron dicarbonyl dimer, an organometallic compound 
Fp2: an EEG electrode site according to the 10-20 system
FP2: Beats of Rage, a 2018 comedy film
Fairphone 2, a smartphone by Fairphone B.V.